Lee County is a county in U.S. state of Mississippi. At the 2020 census, the population was 83,353. Lee County is included in the Tupelo Micropolitan Statistical Area.

History
Lee County was established by the state legislature on October 26, 1866, and named for General Robert E. Lee, General in Chief of the Armies of the Confederate States. It was formed from Itawamba and Pontotoc; therefore, the record and list of pioneers mentioned in those counties embrace a great number who were residents of what is now Lee.

Geography

Major highways
  Interstate 22
  U.S. Highway 45
  U.S. Highway 78
  U.S. Route 278
  Natchez Trace Parkway
  Mississippi Highway 6

Adjacent counties
 Prentiss County (north)
 Itawamba County (east)
 Monroe County (southeast)
 Chickasaw County (southwest)
 Pontotoc County (west)
 Union County (northwest)

National protected areas
 Brices Cross Roads National Battlefield Site
 Natchez Trace Parkway (part)
 Tupelo National Battlefield

Demographics

2020 census

As of the 2020 United States Census, there were 83,343 people, 30,378 households, and 21,437 families residing in the county.

2000 census
As of the census of 2000, there were 75,755 people, 29,200 households, and 20,819 families residing in the county.  The population density was 168 people per square mile (65/km2). There were 31,887 housing units at an average density of 71 per square mile (27/km2).  The racial makeup of the county was 73.66% White, 24.51% Black or African American, 0.13% Native American, 0.52% Asian, 0.01% Pacific Islander, 0.43% from other races, and 0.74% from two or more races. 1.16% of the population were Hispanic or Latino of any race. There were 29,200 households, out of which 36.10% had children under the age of 18 living with them, 52.60% were married couples living together, 14.60% had a female householder with no husband present, and 28.70% were non-families. 25.00% of all households were made up of individuals, and 8.50% had someone living alone who was 65 years of age or older. The average household size was 2.55 and the average family size was 3.05. In the county, the population was spread out, with 27.70% under the age of 18, 8.50% from 18 to 24, 30.50% from 25 to 44, 21.80% from 45 to 64, and 11.50% who were 65 years of age or older. The median age was 35 years. For every 100 females, there were 92.30 males.  For every 100 females age 18 and over, there were 87.50 males. The median income for a household in the county was $36,165, and the median income for a family was $43,149. Males had a median income of $31,039 versus $22,235 for females. The per capita income for the county was $18,956. About 10.50% of families and 13.40% of the population were below the poverty line, including 17.90% of those under age 18 and 15.50% of those age 65 or over. Lee County has the ninth highest per capita income in the state of Mississippi.

Communities

Cities
 Baldwyn (partly in Prentiss County)
 Saltillo
 Tupelo (county seat)
 Verona

Towns
 Guntown
 Nettleton (partly in Monroe County)
 Plantersville
 Shannon
 Sherman (partly in Pontotoc County and Union County)

Census-designated places
 Mooreville

Unincorporated communities
 Barrett Ridge
 Belden
 Brewer
 Eggville
 Jug Fork

Education
Lee County is served by the Baldwyn, Lee County, Nettleton, and Tupelo school districts.

Politics

Lee County has been a Republican stronghold since the mid-1980s. The last Democratic candidate who carried this county was Jimmy Carter in the election of 1980.

See also

 List of counties in Mississippi
 List of memorials to Robert E. Lee
 National Register of Historic Places listings in Lee County, Mississippi

References

External links

 Government
 
 General information
 
 Lee-Itawamba Library System

 
Lee County
Lee County, Mississippi
Lee County
Lee County, Mississippi
Lee County